Servitka Roma (Ukrainian Серви, Russian Сэрвы) is a subgroup of Romani. They formed as a group in Ukraine, where their ancestors had come from Serbia.

Well-known Servitka Roma
 Eugene Hütz, musician
 Nickolai Slichenko, theatre and cinema actor, Romen Theatre director
 Sasha Kolpakov, guitarist

See also 
 Romani people in Ukraine
 Ruska Roma
 Polska Roma

References 

 "Beliefs of Ukrainian Roma as historic-religion resource" by Olexandr Belikov ("Вірування Ромів України як історико-релігієзнавче джерело", Олександр Беліков).

External links
 Roma and "Gypsies"
 The Roma: between a myth and the future
 Book of Memory  in Russian

Romani groups
Romani in Russia
Romani in Ukraine
Roma (Romani subgroup)
Ethnic groups in Ukraine
Ethnic groups in Russia
Serbian diaspora